Argentina competed at the 2022 Winter Paralympics in Beijing, China which took place between 4–13 March 2022.

Competitors
The following is the list of number of competitors participating at the Games per sport/discipline.

Alpine skiing

Enrique Plantey competed in the mono-skiing.

Cross-country skiing

Argentina sent one athlete to compete in cross-country skiing.

Men's distance

Sprint

See also
Argentina at the Paralympics
Argentina at the 2022 Winter Olympics

References

Nations at the 2022 Winter Paralympics
2022
Winter Paralympics